Richer Dompierre (born July 28, 1957) is a politician in Montreal, Quebec, Canada. He served on the Montreal city council from 1998 to 2009, initially as a member of Vision Montreal (VM) and later for the rival Union Montreal (UM).

Early life and private career
Born in Montreal, Dompierre has worked in the printing sector in 1979. In 2010–11, he was the publisher of "Qui est qui du Québec" (English: "Who's who in Quebec").

Councillor
Dompierre was first elected to the Montreal city council in 1998 as a Vision Montreal candidate in the east-end division of Maisonneuve. VM won a landslide majority in this election under Pierre Bourque's leadership; after the election, Bourque appointed Dompierre as an associate member of the Montreal executive committee (i.e., the municipal cabinet) with responsibility for economic development.

Gérald Tremblay's Montreal Island Citizens Union (MICU) defeated Vision Montreal in the 2001 municipal election. Dompierre was re-elected in Maisonneuve and served as a member of the official opposition; he also became a member of the newly created Mercier–Hochelaga-Maisonneuve borough council. In 2003, he filed a police complaint alleging that fellow Vision Montreal councillor Ivon Le Duc had attacked him during a heated borough council debate over a proposed move of the Jean-Paul Riopelle sculpture La Joute. The chief crown prosecutor confirmed there was enough evidence to charge Le Duc with assault, but ultimately no charges were laid. Le Duc instead took part in a program that allowed for the non-judicial treatment of certain infractions.

Dompierre ran for the redistributed Louis-Riel division in the 2005 municipal election and was narrowly re-elected over fellow councillor Nicolas Tétrault. The electoral office initially showed Tétrault elected by twelve votes, but a more thorough scrutiny confirmed Dompierre as the winner. The following year, Dompierre was the only VM councillor to support an unsuccessful plan to rename Montreal's Park Avenue and Bleury Street area after former Quebec premier Robert Bourassa. He left Vision Montreal to join Tremblay's party (by this time renamed as Union Montreal) in June 2008. In the 2009 municipal election, he was defeated by VM candidate Lyn Thériault.

Provincial politics
Dompierre ran as a Liberal Party candidate in the 2003 Quebec provincial election in the east-end Montreal division of Hochelaga-Maisonneuve. He finished second against Parti Québécois incumbent Louise Harel.

Electoral record
Municipal

Provincial

References

Living people
Montreal city councillors
1957 births